Akolzin is a surname. Notable people with the surname include:

Pavel Akolzin (born 1990), Russian ice hockey player
Vadim Akolzin (born 1982), Israeli pair skater